Toews is a surname of Russian Mennonite origin, an abbreviation of Matthäus (Matthews). Notable people with this name include:

 Brian Toews (1941-2019), Canadian curler, 1984 Brier champion
 BT Toews (born 1966), Canadian basketball coach for the WJBL's Fujitsu Red Wave
 David Toews (born 1990), Canadian hockey player
 David Waltner-Toews (born 1948), Canadian epidemiologist, essayist, poet, fiction writer and veterinarian
 Devon Toews (born 1994), Canadian hockey player for the NHL's Colorado Avalanche 
 Gisela Toews (born 1940), German speed skater
 Jeff Toews (born 1957), American former NFL offensive tackle and guard
 John E. Toews, Canadian historian of 19th-century Germany at the University of Washington
 Jonathan Toews (born 1988), Canadian hockey player for the NHL's Chicago Blackhawks
 Kai Toews (born 1998), Japanese basketball player for the B. League's Shiga Lakes
 Loren Toews (born 1951), American former professional football player
 Georgia Toews (born 1990), Canadian novelist
 Miriam Toews (born 1964), Canadian writer of Mennonite descent
 Vic Toews (born 1952), Canadian politician

See also
 Toews Lake, Manitoba, Canada, named after Jonathan Toews

References

Russian Mennonite surnames